Eriogonum baileyi is a species of wild buckwheat that is commonly known as Bailey's buckwheat. It is native to the western United States, where it is a common member of the flora in several types of sandy habitat, such as desert and sagebrush. Eriogonum baileyi is an annual herb. It produces a spreading to erect, often wool-coated stem up to about half a meter tall. Leaves are woolly, round and located at the base of the plant. The inflorescence is a branching cyme bearing many clusters of flowers. The individual flowers are 1 to 2 millimeters wide and white or pink in color.

References

External links
Jepson Manual Treatment
Flora of North America

baileyi